The Estadio Fortunato Bonelli is an indoor arena in San Nicolás de los Arroyos, Argentina. It is primarily used for basketball and is the home arena of the Belgrano de San Nicolás. It holds 2,600 people.

References

Fortunato Bonelli
Basketball venues in Argentina